Manuel Vázquez Montalbán (14 June 1939–18 October 2003) was a prolific Spanish writer from Catalonia: journalist, novelist, poet, essayist, anthologue, prologist, humorist, critic and political prisoner as well as a gastronome and a FC Barcelona supporter.

Biography
Vázquez Montalbán was born in Barcelona on 14 June 1939. His parents did not register his birth until 27 July; many sources show 27 July or 14 July as his birth date. He studied Philosophy at the Autonomous University of Barcelona and was also a member of the Unified Socialist Party of Catalonia. He spent 18 months in prison after attending a 1962 miner's strike.

He began writing poetry in 1967.  He is one of the Novísimos from Jose María Castellet. His poetic works until 1986 are collected in Memoria y deseo ("Memory and desire").

The same characteristic features of his poetry appear in his novels. Los mares del Sur, part of the Pepe Carvalho series, won the Planeta Award in 1979, bringing fame for both the writer and the fictional detective, who would later be portrayed in films, TV series and comic strips. In 1988, he wrote and published a children's book called, Escenas de la Literatura Universal y Retratos de Grandes Autores (English version as "Scenes from World Literature and Portraits of Greatest Authors"), which is illustrated by Willi Glasauer, and published by Círculo de Lectores. This children's book includes fun facts, trivia, and information accompanied by photos and Willi Glasauer's illustrations of the likes of Ramón del Valle-Inclán, Gabriel García Márquez, Hermann Hesse, Agatha Christie, Federico García Lorca, William Shakespeare, Samuel Beckett, Günter Grass, Marguerite Duras, Miguel de Cervantes, Elias Canetti, Johann Wolfgang von Goethe, Albert Camus, Jonathan Swift, Virginia Woolf, Franz Kafka, Doris Lessing, Vladimir Nabokov, Jorge Luis Borges, James Joyce, Jean-Paul Sartre, Thomas Mann, William Faulkner, and Ernest Hemingway.

Other narrative works include narrative productions Galíndez (1991), winner of the National Narrative Award; El estrangulador (The strangler) (1994) and Erec y Enide (Erec and Enide) (2002). In 1992 he published Autobiografía del general Franco, which was awarded the 1994 international prize Premio Internacional de Literatura Ennio Flaiano. He also wrote non-literary works in Catalan, notably L'art del menjar a Catalunya (1977).
For many years, he contributed columns and articles to the Madrid-based daily newspaper El País.

He died in Bangkok, Thailand, while returning to his home country from a speaking tour of Australia. His last book, La aznaridad, was published posthumously.

Detective Carvalho saga
The first novel featuring the 50-year-old gastronome-detective Pepe Carvalho is Yo maté a Kennedy (I killed Kennedy) in 1972, followed by Tatuaje (Tattoo) in 1975 and La soledad del manager (The Angst-Ridden Executive) in 1977.

The rest of the Pepe Carvalho saga is as follows:
Los mares del Sur 1979 
Asesinato en el Comité Central (Murder in the Central Committee) 1981
Los pájaros de Bangkok (The Birds of Bangkok) 1983
La rosa de Alejandría (Alexandria's Rose) 1984
El balneario (The Spa) 1986 
El delantero centro fue asesinado al atardecer (Offside) 1989
El laberinto griego (The Greek Labyrinth) 1991
Sabotaje olímpico (Olympic Sabotage) 1993
El hermano pequeño (The Little Brother) 1994
El Premio (The Prize) 1996
Quinteto de Buenos Aires (Buenos Aires Quintet) 1997
El hombre de mi vida (The Man of My Life) 2000
Milenio Carvalho (Carvalho Millennium) 2004, edited in two parts.

The gastronome 
Vázquez Montalbán was also a gastronome. Gastronomical references can be found in all the novels of the Pepe Carvalho series, which include some recipes such as the "rice tagliatelle fideuà" that Carvalho prepares in Los pájaros de Bangkok. He displays all his gastronomic knowledge, with erudition and humility, in Contra los Gourmets (Against Gourmets), an initiation in the world of gastronomy. Contra los Gourmets concentrates on Spanish cuisine, but covers international cuisine, traditional cuisine and nouvelle cuisine. He also considers eating fashions such as "healthy food" and "light products".  Other gastronomic works by Montalbán are L'art del menjar a Catalunya (Cocina Catalana), Recetas inmorales (Immoral recipes) and Reflexiones de Robinsón ante un bacalao.

Essays 
He wrote essays about journalism, politics, sociology, sports, history, cuisine, biographies, literature or music.
His first essay, Informe sobre la Información (Report about Information) (1963) is still one of the best studies on journalism ever published in Spain.
Some of his other works are:
Crónica sentimental de España (Sentimental Chronicle of Spain), 1971
Joan Manuel Serrat, 1972
El libro gris de Televisión Española (The Grey TV Book), 1973
Diccionario del Franquismo, (Dictionary of the Franco times) 1977
Panfleto desde el planeta de los simios (Pamphlet from the Planet of the Apes), 1995
Un polaco en la corte del rey Juan Carlos (A Pole - meaning a Catalan, here used ironically - in the Court of King Juan Carlos), 1996, an analysis of the political life in Madrid, in the last years of Felipe González's government.
Y Dios entró en La Habana (And God entered La Habana), 1998, about Cuba, Fidel Castro and the visit of the Pope John Paul II.
Marcos: el señor de los espejos (Marcos: the Lord of the Mirrors), 1999.

Awards in his name 
To commemorate him, the FC Barcelona Foundation and the Catalan College of Journalists have awarded the Manuel Vázquez Montalbán International Journalism Award since 2004.
The award includes two categories:
 Sport Journalism.
 Cultural and/or Political Journalism.
Also, the Italian writer Andrea Camilleri called his main character Salvo Montalbano in honour of him.

Notes

External links
Website about Manuel Vázquez Montalbán
 Some of his poems in Spanish

1939 births
2003 deaths
Writers from Barcelona
Spanish male novelists
Journalists from Catalonia
Novísimos
Spanish mystery writers
Food writers from Catalonia
Spanish communists
Spanish male poets
Spanish gastronomes
Autonomous University of Barcelona alumni
20th-century Spanish poets
20th-century Spanish novelists
20th-century Spanish journalists